Cristina Antolín (born 15 September 1973) is a Spanish sports shooter. She competed in two events at the 1996 Summer Olympics.

References

External links
 

1973 births
Living people
Spanish female sport shooters
Olympic shooters of Spain
Shooters at the 1996 Summer Olympics
People from Palencia
Sportspeople from the Province of Palencia
20th-century Spanish women